In mathematics, a Raynaud surface is a particular kind of algebraic surface that was introduced in  and named for . To be precise, a Raynaud surface is a quasi-elliptic surface over an algebraic curve of genus g greater than 1, such that all fibers are irreducible and the fibration has a section. The Kodaira vanishing theorem fails for such surfaces; in other words the Kodaira theorem, valid in algebraic geometry over the complex numbers, has such surfaces as counterexamples, and these can only exist in characteristic p.

References

Algebraic surfaces